Hainan Airlines serves the following destinations (as of March 2023):

List

References

External links 
Hainan Airlines (in Chinese)
Hainan Airlines (in English)

Lists of airline destinations
Hainan Airlines